The M13 or King Cetshwayo Highway is a metropolitan route in the Ethekwini Metropolitan Municipality in the KwaZulu-Natal province of South Africa. For part of its route, it is a highway and it acts as an alternative route to the N3 Highway for travel between the suburbs closer to the Durban CBD and the Outer West Suburbs (Assagay).

Route 

The route starts in the Durban Central Business District. For the first few kilometres of its length, it runs parallel to the N3 on both sides as King Ndinuzulu Road North and King Ndinuzulu Road South (formerly Berea Road; one-way-streets). At the Tollgate Bridge, it then turns to the south and passes westwards through Mayville (where it is co-signed with the M10 for a few metres), before turning north and crossing under the N3 to pass through Sherwood.

At 45th Cutting, the route becomes a dual-carriageway freeway for the rest of its length. The route passes over the N2 Highway (Durban Outer Ring Road) westwards as a flyover and passes through Westville and Cowies Hill. The route then briefly touches the N3 at the Paradise Valley interchange (eastbound only) (motorists can drive from the N3 west onto the M13 west and from the M13 east onto the N3 east), before passing through Pinetown.

After Pinetown, the route goes up Fields Hill, a 3 km 1:15 gradient (this section is notorious for heavy vehicle accidents that can close an entire carriageway of the road). The route then enters the Upper Highway Area, passing through Kloof and Gillitts, before the R103 diverges, providing access to Hillcrest. The route then passes south of Hillcrest and through Assagay before merging with the N3 freeway (westbound only), where it ends.

The route is roughly 35 km long.

Significance 

The M13 is the main thoroughfare to Durban for residents of the nearby towns of Westville, Pinetown, Kloof, Gillitts and Hillcrest.

The M13 between the Paradise Valley interchange and its termination at the N3 used to be part of the N3 route until 1986, when the N3 was re-routed to pass south of Pinetown, Westmead and Winston Park. The M13 remains an alternative route to the N3, and is commonly used by motorists wishing to avoid the Mariannhill Toll Plaza, located on the N3 outside Westmead.

References

Highways in South Africa
Metropolitan Routes in Durban